Akhandhalli  is a village in the southern state of Karnataka, India, located in the Jevargi taluk of Kalaburagi district.

See also
 Gulbarga
 Districts of Karnataka

References

External links
 http://Gulbarga.nic.in/

Villages in Kalaburagi district